Edmond Werdet (6 November 1793 - 1870) was a French author and book publisher.

Life 
He was married in June 1845 and  had one son whose name was Oscar. He went bankrupt in 1837 and again in 1845, dying in poverty.

Author 
The following books authored by him are currently extant:

 Portrait intime de Balzac (Paris: E. Dentu, 1859)
 De la librairie française : Son passé--son présent--son avenir, avec des notices biographiques sur les libraires-éditeurs les plus distingués depuis 1789 (Paris: E. Dentu, 1860)
 Souvenirs de la vie littéraire (E. Dentu, 1879)
 Histoire du livre en France depuis les temps les plus reculés jusqu'en 1789 (Paris: E. Dentu, 1861; 4 volumes)

Publisher 
He was the publisher of the following books:

 La Vieille Fille
 Le Lys dans la vallée
 Splendeurs et misères des courtisanes

References 

Writers from Bordeaux
1793 births
1870 deaths
19th-century French journalists
French male journalists
French publishers (people)
French bibliographers
19th-century French male writers